There are a number of listed buildings in South Yorkshire. The term "listed building", in the United Kingdom, refers to a building or structure designated as being of special architectural, historical, or cultural significance. Details of all the listed buildings are contained in the National Heritage List for England. They are categorised in three grades: Grade I consists of buildings of outstanding architectural or historical interest, Grade II* includes significant buildings of more than local interest and Grade II consists of buildings of special architectural or historical interest. Buildings in England are listed by the Secretary of State for Culture, Media and Sport on recommendations provided by English Heritage, which also determines the grading.

Some listed buildings are looked after by the National Trust or English Heritage while others are in private ownership or administered by trusts.

Listed buildings by grade
 Grade I listed buildings in South Yorkshire
 Grade II* listed buildings in South Yorkshire

Listed buildings by civil parish or unparished area

Barnsley

 Listed buildings in Barnsley (Central Ward)
 Listed buildings in Barnsley (Kingstone Ward)
 Listed buildings in Barnsley (Old Town Ward)
 Listed buildings in Billingley
 Listed buildings in Brierley and Grimethorpe
 Listed buildings in Cawthorne
 Listed buildings in Cudworth, South Yorkshire
 Listed buildings in Darfield, South Yorkshire
 Listed buildings in Darton
 Listed buildings in Dearne North
 Listed buildings in Dearne South
 Listed buildings in Dodworth
 Listed buildings in Dunford
 Listed buildings in Great Houghton, South Yorkshire
 Listed buildings in Gunthwaite and Ingbirchworth
 Listed buildings in High Hoyland
 Listed buildings in Hoyland Milton
 Listed buildings in Hunshelf
 Listed buildings in Langsett
 Listed buildings in Monk Bretton
 Listed buildings in Oxspring
 Listed buildings in Penistone
 Listed buildings in Penistone East
 Listed buildings in Rockingham
 Listed buildings in Royston, South Yorkshire
 Listed buildings in Silkstone
 Listed buildings in Stainborough
 Listed buildings in Stairfoot
 Listed buildings in Tankersley, South Yorkshire
 Listed buildings in Thurgoland
 Listed buildings in Wombwell
 Listed buildings in Worsbrough
 Listed buildings in Wortley, South Yorkshire

Doncaster

 Listed buildings in Adwick le Street and Carcroft
 Listed buildings in Adwick upon Dearne
 Listed buildings in Auckley
 Listed buildings in Barnburgh
 Listed buildings in Barnby Dun with Kirk Sandall
 Listed buildings in Bawtry
 Listed buildings in Braithwell
 Listed buildings in Brodsworth
 Listed buildings in Burghwallis
 Listed buildings in Cadeby, South Yorkshire
 Listed buildings in Cantley, South Yorkshire
 Listed buildings in Clayton with Frickley
 Listed buildings in Conisbrough and Denaby
 Listed buildings in Doncaster (Balby South Ward)
 Listed buildings in Doncaster (Bentley Ward)
 Listed buildings in Doncaster (Bessacarr Ward)
 Listed buildings in Doncaster (Hexthorpe and Balby North Ward)
 Listed buildings in Doncaster (Town Ward)
 Listed buildings in Doncaster (Wheatley Hills and Intake Ward)
 Listed buildings in Edenthorpe
 Listed buildings in Edlington
 Listed buildings in Fenwick, South Yorkshire
 Listed buildings in Finningley
 Listed buildings in Fishlake
 Listed buildings in Hampole
 Listed buildings in Hatfield, South Yorkshire
 Listed buildings in Hickleton
 Listed buildings in High Melton
 Listed buildings in Hooton Pagnell
 Listed buildings in Kirk Bramwith
 Listed buildings in Loversall
 Listed buildings in Marr, South Yorkshire
 Listed buildings in Mexborough
 Listed buildings in Moss, South Yorkshire
 Listed buildings in Norton and Askern
 Listed buildings in Owston, South Yorkshire
 Listed buildings in Rossington
 Listed buildings in Sprotbrough and Cusworth
 Listed buildings in Stainforth, South Yorkshire
 Listed buildings in Stainton, South Yorkshire
 Listed buildings in Sykehouse
 Listed buildings in Thorne, South Yorkshire
 Listed buildings in Thorpe in Balne
 Listed buildings in Tickhill
 Listed buildings in Wadworth
 Listed buildings in Warmsworth

Rotherham

 Listed buildings in Anston
 Listed buildings in Aston cum Aughton
 Listed buildings in Bramley, Rotherham
 Listed buildings in Brampton Bierlow
 Listed buildings in Brinsworth
 Listed buildings in Catcliffe
 Listed buildings in Dinnington St. John's
 Listed buildings in Firbeck
 Listed buildings in Gildingwells
 Listed buildings in Harthill with Woodall
 Listed buildings in Hellaby
 Listed buildings in Hooton Levitt
 Listed buildings in Hooton Roberts
 Listed buildings in Laughton en le Morthen
 Listed buildings in Letwell
 Listed buildings in Maltby, South Yorkshire
 Listed buildings in Ravenfield
 Listed buildings in Rawmarsh
 Listed buildings in Rotherham (Boston Castle Ward)
 Listed buildings in Rotherham (East Ward)
 Listed buildings in Rotherham (Hoober Ward)
 Listed buildings in Rotherham (Keppel Ward)
 Listed buildings in Rotherham (Sitwell Ward)
 Listed buildings in Rotherham (West Ward)
 Listed buildings in Rotherham (Wingfield Ward)
 Listed buildings in Swinton, South Yorkshire
 Listed buildings in Thorpe Salvin
 Listed buildings in Thrybergh
 Listed buildings in Thurcroft
 Listed buildings in Todwick
 Listed buildings in Treeton
 Listed buildings in Ulley
 Listed buildings in Wales, South Yorkshire
 Listed buildings in Wath upon Dearne
 Listed buildings in Wentworth, South Yorkshire
 Listed buildings in Whiston, South Yorkshire
 Listed buildings in Wickersley
 Listed buildings in Woodsetts

City of Sheffield

 Listed buildings in Midhopestones
 Listed buildings in Sheffield
 Listed buildings in Sheffield City Centre
 Listed buildings in Sheffield S2
 Listed buildings in Sheffield S3
 Listed buildings in Sheffield S4
 Listed buildings in Sheffield S5
 Listed buildings in Sheffield S6
 Listed buildings in Sheffield S7
 Listed buildings in Sheffield S8
 Listed buildings in Sheffield S9
 Listed buildings in Sheffield S10
 Listed buildings in Sheffield S11
 Listed buildings in Sheffield S12
 Listed buildings in Sheffield S13
 Listed buildings in Sheffield S14
 Listed buildings in Sheffield S17
 Listed buildings in Sheffield S20
 Listed buildings in Sheffield S35
 Listed buildings in Stocksbridge

References

Listed buildings in South Yorkshire